István Prihoda (15 November 1891 – 22 November 1965) was a Hungarian sports shooter. He competed in three events at the 1912 Summer Olympics.

References

1891 births
1965 deaths
Sportspeople from Cluj-Napoca
Hungarian male sport shooters
Olympic shooters of Hungary
Shooters at the 1912 Summer Olympics